Semih Saygıner (born November 12, 1964), nicknamed Mr. Magic or The Turkish Prince, is a Turkish world champion professional carom billiards player specialized in three-cushion event.

Family life
Semih Saygıner was born to a tailor father Faruk and a homemaker mother Süreyya in Adapazarı, Turkey on November 12, 1964. He is the fifth of six siblings. His parents passed away due to a traffic accident in 1978 when he was 14 years old. Saygıner then started playing billiards. He had a good performance in high school but left for depression over the loss of his mother and father.

Saygıner opened up a billiards hall, and taught the cue sport. In 1995, he married Aygen Berk, a student of his, the women's billiards champion of Turkey and co-founder of the Turkish Billiards Federation. Their marriage ended a few years later.

From 1996 to 1997, he served as the president of the Turkish Billiards Federation.

Career
He began playing billiards at age 16, and focused on the cue sport. A year later, he participated at Istanbul Championship, and won his first Turkish title. Ranking many years on the second place at national level, he finally became Turkish champion in 1987.

In 1991, he participated at German Open. The next year, he placed world eighth when he defeated world-champion Raymond Ceulemans by 3-0 in Berlin. In 1994, he transferred to the Netherlands Billiards Teams League, one of the most important leagues of billiards. Saygıner won the Three-cushion World Cup held 1998 in Antalya after defeating Dutchman Gerwin Walentijn in the final. Saygıner won the 1999 CEB European Three-cushion Championship by defeating Dion Nelin of Denmark. He nearly won it again the next year but lost to Daniel Sánchez. He was the first from his country to win that tournament. His countryman Murat Naci Çoklu won the title five years later.

In 2003, Saygıner won the UMB World Three-cushion Championship defeating of Filippos Kasidokostas of Greece. He is the only Turk ever to win the championship. That same year, he won the last World Three-cushion Championship organized by the Billiards World Cup Association (BWA) beating Dick Jaspers. He and his teammate Tayfun Taşdemir became world champion at the UMB World Three-cushion Championship for National Teams held 2003 in Viersen, Germany. Saygıner was named Best Billiards Player 2003 in Antwerp, Belgium on February 7, 2004.

Saygıner transferred to Portugal playing for FC Porto Billiards team. He captained the team for three years, and won the bronze medal at the 2004–05 European Three-cushion Cup with the team.

He is the 25-time winner of Turkish Grand Prix in total. He won the Turkish champion title 14 times in three-cushion. Furthermore, he has ten champion titles in carom billiards in Turkey, as well as one each in cadre 47/2 and one-cushion. In 2006, he ranked at 8th place of the world bests of Union Mondiale de Billard (UMB). His highest average in a match is 3.571 (50 points in 14 innings).

In 2009, Saygıner signed a contract with the cue-stick producer Longoni. Under the contract, a series of cue sticks that bear Saygıner's name has been available from the company.

Saygıner announced his retirement from active sports in 2006, continuing to participate only in some international competitions. His last international participation was in 2007. However, he made his comeback in 2015 by winning the Turkish championship again. Following the championship, he was named to take part in the Turkey national team.

Achievements

 1993
  Three-Cushion World Cup Leg 3, Berlin, Germany

 1994
  Three-Cushion World Cup Leg 7, Ghent, Belgium

 1995
  Korea Three-cushion Open, Suwon, South Korea
  Mersin International Tournament, Mersin, Turkey

 1996
  Mersin International Tournament, Mersin, Turkey
  Three-Cushion World Cup Leg 7, Antwerp, Belgium

 1997
  Crystal Kelly Cup, Monte Carlo, Monaco
  Three-Cushion World Cup Leg 6, osterhout, Netherlands

 1998
  Three-Cushion World Cup Leg 3, Lisbon, Portugal
  Three-Cushion World Cup Leg 6, Bogotá, Colombia
  Three-Cushion World Cup Leg 7, Torremolinos, Spain
  Three-Cushion World Cup Leg 8, Oosterhout, Netherlands
  Three-Cushion World Cup Leg 9, Antalya, Turkey
  Three-Cushion World Cup, Antwerp, Belgium
  Dutch International Tournament, Zundert, Netherlands

 1999
  Three-Cushion World Cup Leg 1, Seoul, South Korea
  Three-Cushion World Cup Leg 2, Las Vegas, USA
  USA Three-cushion Open, San Jose, California, USA
  Dutch Grand Prix, Barendrecht, Netherlands
  CEB European Three-cushion Championship, Porto, Portugal

 2000
  Three-Cushion World Cup Leg 1, Bogotá, Colombia
  World Cup Series - Leg 5
  Denmark Three-cushion Open, Denmark
  USA Three-cushion Open, Boston, USA
  USA Three-cushion Open, Atlanta, USA
  Mexico Three-cushion Open, Mexico City, Mexico
  Metropol-Diamond Cup, Antwerp, Belgium
  CEB European Three-cushion Championship, Madrid, Spain
  Greece Three-cushion Open, Athens, Greece
  Japan Cup, Tokyo, Japan

 2001
  Three-Cushion World Cup Leg 3, Kuşadası, Turkey
  Three-Cushion World Cup Leg 4, Lugo, Spain
  Three-Cushion World Cup Leg 5, Oosterhout, Netherlands
  Three-Cushion World Cup, Bogotá, Colombia
  Metropol-Diamond Cup, Antwerp, Belgium
  Crystal Kelly Cup, Monte Carlo, Monaco

 2002
  European Team Championship (with Dutch team Van Wanrooij), Porto, Portugal
  Japan Cup, Tokyo, Japan
  Crystal Kelly Cup, Monte Carlo, Monaco

 2003
  Three-Cushion World Cup, Las Vegas, USA
  World Championship, Las Vegas, USA
  World Championship, Valladolid, Spain
  World National Teams Championship, Versen, Germany

 2004
  Three-Cushion World Cup Leg 1, Barendrecht, Netherlands
  Three-Cushion World Cup Leg 2, Athens, Greece
  Three-Cushion World Cup Leg 3, Seville, Spain
  Three-Cushion World Cup Leg 3, Antwerp, Belgium
  World National Teams Championship, Versen, Germany
  Super Cup, Antwerp, Belgium

 2005
  Three-Cushion World Cup Leg 1, Sluiskil, Netherlands
  Three-Cushion World Cup Leg 2, Hurghada, Egypt
  European Teams Championship (with Portuguese team FC Porto Billiards), France
  World Games, Duisburg, Germany
  Crystal Kelly Cup, Monte Carlo, Monaco
  Sang Lee International Open, Flushing, New York, USA

 2006
  Three-Cushion World Cup Leg 5, Istanbul, Turkey
  CEB European Three-cushion Championship, Antalya, Turkey
  UMB World Three-cushion Championship for National Teams, Vieersen, Germany
  Sang Lee International Open, Flushing, New York, USA

 2007
  Three-Cushion World Cup Leg 2, Manisa, Turkey
  Three-Cushion World Cup Leg 3, Corfu, Greece
  Sang Lee International Open, Flushing, New York, USA

 2008
 Semi-finalist AGIPI Billiard Masters

 2021
  Three-Cushion World Cup Leg 2, Sharm El Sheikh, Egypt

Awards

 1994 Olympic Torch Award, Istanbul, Turkey
 2003 Sportsperson of the Year by newspaper Zaman, Istanbul, Turkey
 2004 World's Best Three-cushion Player, Antwerp, Belgium
 2004 Sportsperson of the Year by newspaper Milliyet, Istanbul, Turkey

References

External links
 
 Magnificent Shots by Semih Sayginer

1964 births
Living people
Turkish carom billiards players
World champions in three-cushion billiards
Sportspeople from Adapazarı
Sports world record holders
Turkish expatriate sportspeople in the Netherlands
Turkish expatriate sportspeople in Portugal
World Games bronze medalists
Competitors at the 2005 World Games